Laternula is a genus of bivalves belonging to the family Laternulidae. 

The genus has cosmopolitan distribution.

Species
Laternula albertensis 
Laternula anatina 
Laternula argentea  (taxon inquirendum)
 Laternula boschasina (Reeve, 1860)
 Laternula bullata (Reeve, 1863)
 Laternula corrugata (Reeve, 1863)
 Laternula creccina (Reeve, 1860)
 Laternula elliptica (P. P. King, 1832)
 Laternula gracilis (Reeve, 1860)
 Laternula impura (Pilsbry, 1901)
 Laternula japonica (Lischke, 1872)
 Laternula laterna (Lamarck, 1818)
 Laternula navicula (Reeve, 1863)
 Laternula takekosugei Thach, 2020

References

External links
 Röding P.F. (1798). Museum Boltenianum sive Catalogus cimeliorum e tribus regnis naturæ quæ olim collegerat Joa. Fried Bolten, M. D. p. d. per XL. annos proto physicus Hamburgensis. Pars secunda continens Conchylia sive Testacea univalvia, bivalvia & multivalvia. Trapp, Hamburg. viii, 199 pp
 Lamarck [J.-B. M. de. (1818). Histoire naturelle des animaux sans vertèbres. Tome 5. Paris: Deterville/Verdière, 612 pp]
 Megerle von Mühlfeld J.C. (1811). Entwurf eines neuen Systems der Schaltiergehäuse. Magazin für die neuesten Entdecklungen in der gesammten Naturkunde von der Gesellschaft Naturforschaft Freunde zu Berlin. 5(1): 38-72, plate 3
   Aller, R. C. (1974). Prefabrication of shell ornamentation in the bivalve Laternula. Lethaia. 7(1): 43-56.
  Taylor, J. D.; Glover, E. A.; Harper, E. M.; Crame, J. A.; Ikebe, C.; Williams, S. T. (2018). Left in the cold? Evolutionary origin of Laternula elliptica, a keystone bivalve species of Antarctic benthos. Biological Journal of the Linnean Society. 123(2): 360-376
 Gray, J. E. (1847). A list of the genera of recent Mollusca, their synonyma and types. Proceedings of the Zoological Society of London. (1847) 15: 129-219

Laternulidae
Bivalve genera